"Yes we are" is the 23rd single by Sandaime J Soul Brothers. It was released on March 13, 2019.

Background
"Yes we are" was the first single released by Sandaime J Soul Brothers in 2019. The single marked the first release by the group after a year and four months since their last release "J.S.B Happiness". The single peaked at number two on the Oricon Weekly Charts with 93,660 points. By the end of the year the single had scored a total of 226,173 points.
The EP's 1st track "Raise The Flag" was used as the official theme of the group's eponymous tour "Raise The Flag".

Track listing

Charts

Certifications

References

2019 singles
Avex Group singles
Sandaime J Soul Brothers songs